Lori Dungey (born 1957) is a New Zealand actress. Dungey was born in Canada and came to New Zealand when she performed in an arts festival during the Commonwealth Games in Auckland in 1990. Dungey subsequently became the artistic director of the Wellington Improv Company. She has had acting roles in both film and television including Lord of the Rings films and the television series Xena and Hercules. She has also performed in New Zealand's Improve Festival.

Partial filmography

Voice-over roles
Power Rangers Ninja Storm: Beevil
Power Rangers Mystic Force: Screamer
Power Rangers Operation Overdrive: Crazar
Power Rangers RPM: Computer (episode 29 & 30)
Power Rangers Dino Charge: Memorella
Power Rangers Beast Morphers: Gamertron

Television roles
Xena: Warrior Princess: Kellos
Hercules: The Legendary Journeys: Fortune, Time Share Saleswoman
Young Hercules: Traveller, Mad Medicine Woman
Mercy Peak: Ellen Palliser
Power Rangers Dino Thunder: Mrs. Porter
Power Rangers S.P.D.: Louise Boom
Power Rangers Ninja Steel: Mrs. Bell (2017-2018)

Movie roles
The Lord of the Rings: The Fellowship of the Ring: Mrs. Bracegirdle (extended version)
M3GAN: Celia

Short film roles
Mrs Bracegirdle's Woodlyn Park Adventure: Mrs. Bracegirdle (2007)

References

External links

1957 births
Living people
New Zealand voice actresses
New Zealand television actresses
New Zealand film actresses